The wheel spider or golden wheel spider (Carparachne aureoflava), is a huntsman spider native to the Namib Desert of Southern Africa. This spider should not be confused with Leucorchestris arenicola, a spider sharing the same common name as well as the same locale. The spider escapes parasitic pompilid wasps by flipping onto its side and cartwheeling down sand dunes at speeds of up to 44 turns per second.

Characteristics
Wheel spiders are up to 20 mm in size, with males and females the same size. The wheel spider is a nocturnal, free-ranging hunter, coming out at night to prey on insects and other small invertebrates. Its bite is mildly venomous, but the spider is not known to be harmful to humans.

The wheel spider does not produce a web. Its principal line of defence against predation is to bury itself in a silk-lined burrow extending 40–50 cm deep. It is during the initial stages of building a burrow that the spider is vulnerable to pompilid wasps, which will sting and paralyze the spider before planting eggs in its body.

References

  (2009): The world spider catalog, version 9.5. American Museum of Natural History.

Further reading

External links
, featuring a rolling golden wheel spider

Rolling animals
Sparassidae
Spiders of Africa